Maldives was turned into a Sultanate in 1153 when the Buddhist King Dhovemi converted to Islam. Prior to that the Maldives was a Buddhist Kingdom, a Hindu Kingdom and before that a matriarchal society with each atoll ruled by a chief queen according to some accounts or by others, several theocratic societies ruled by priests known as Sawamias of heliolatric, selenolatric and astrolatric religions. All the rulers before King Koimala only ruled over parts of the Maldives or Deeva Maari (and Dheeva Mahal) as it was known then. Koimala was the first king to rule over all the islands of the Maldives as we know today and the island of Maliku.

The formal title of the Sultan up to 1965 was, Sultan of Land and Sea, Lord of the twelve-thousand islands and Sultan of the Maldives which came with the style Highness. After independence in 1965 the Sultan assumed the title King with the style Majesty. This style was used until 1968, when the Maldives became a republic for the second time. The main official Royal residence of the Sultan was the Etherekoilu, a palace in Malé.

The reigns of Sultans are from three sources. Taarikh (also known as the Tarikh lslam Diba Mahal) by Maldivian chronicler Hasan Taj Al-Din (died in 1727) written in Arabic which covers 670 years of Maldives history, the loamaafaanu copper plates and the third source called Raadhavalhi which was written in 1757 using both Dhives Akuru and Thaana.

Kingdom of Adeetta Vansa to Theemuge dynasty

Solar dynasty (Aditta Vansa)

Lunar dynasty (Soma Vansa)

Lunar or Homa or Theemuge Dynasty (1117-1388, 271 years)

Hilaalee dynasty (1388-1632, 244 years)

Utheemu dynasty (1632-1692, lasted 60 years)

Hamawi dynasty ( Lasted less than 1 year )

Dhevvadhoo dynasty (1692-1701, lasted 9 years)

Isdhoo dynasty (1701-1704, lasted 3 years)

Dhiyamigili dynasty (1704-1759, lasted 55 years)

Sultan in absentia until the return of Dhiyamigili heir Giyath al-Din

Return of Giyath al-Din

Huraa dynasty (1774-1968, lasted 194 years)

See also
History of the Maldives
Kingdom of Dheeva Maari
List of head of state of the Maldives
President of the Maldives
Sultanate of Maldives

Notes 
 Regnal names are in ancient Maldive language. The names are followed with "Maha Radun" for Kings are "Maha Rehendi" for Queens.
 Sometimes there were no coronation ceremony and for those they were called "Keerithi Maha Radun" for kings and "Keerithi Maha Rehendi" for queens.

External links 
The full text of the Tarikh chronicles: 
Volume one - Arabic text (Warning: 127 MB)
Volume two - Notes, indices and additions part 1
Volume two - Notes, indices and additions part 2
Volume two - Notes, indices and additions part 3

References

Official website of the Maldives Royal Family
Allama Ahmed Shihabuddine (original work in Arabic, translated to Dhivehi by Dhoondeyri Don Maniku), Kitab fi Athaari Meedoo el-Qadimiyyeh. Male'

 
Maldives
Monarchs